The 1994 Holiday Bowl was a college football bowl game played December 30, 1994, in San Diego, California. It was part of the 1994 NCAA Division I-A football season. It featured the tenth ranked Colorado State Rams, and the Michigan Wolverines. This game was notable because Michigan, had earlier lost to CSU's in-state rivals the Colorado Buffaloes on a hail mary pass, and was looking to defeat at least one Colorado school.

Game summary
Michigan – Toomer, four-yard pass from Collins (Hamilton kick)
Colorado State – Turner, 32-yard pass from Hill (McDougal kick)
Michigan – Hamilton, 34-yard field goal
Michigan – Hayes, 16-yard pass from Collins Hamilton kick)
Michigan – Wheatley, three-yard run (Hamilton kick)
Colorado State – Burkett, 18-yard pass from Hill (McDougal kick)

In the first quarter, Michigan quarterback Todd Collins threw a 4-yard touchdown pass to wide receiver Amani Toomer, giving the Wolverines a 7–0 lead. Colorado State answered with a 32-yard touchdown pass from quarterback Anthoney Hill to wide receiver Paul Turner to tie the game at 7. All-American kicker Remy Hamilton kicked a 34-yard field goal on Michigan's next drive, as they took a 10–7 lead into the second quarter.

In the second quarter, Todd Collins threw a 16-yard touchdown pass to Mercury Hayes as Michigan took a 17–7 lead. That score would hold up until the third quarter. In the third quarter, running back Tyrone Wheatley scored on a 3-yard touchdown run giving Michigan a 24–7 lead. In the fourth quarter, Colorado State got an 18-yard touchdown pass from Anthoney Hill, as they closed the margin to 24–14.

Statistics

References

External links
 Summary at Bentley Historical Library, University of Michigan Athletics History

Holiday Bowl
Holiday Bowl
Colorado State Rams football bowl games
Michigan Wolverines football bowl games
Holiday Bowl
Holiday Bowl